John Richardson (born Linton, Cambridgeshire, c. 1564 – 1625) was a Biblical scholar and a Master of Trinity College, Cambridge from 1615 until his death.

Life 
He was born ‘of honest parentage’ at Linton, Cambridgeshire. John Richardson matriculated as a sizar from Clare College, Cambridge in 1578, where he graduated B.A. in 1581. He was afterwards elected to a fellowship at Emmanuel College. He proceeded M.A. in 1585, B.D. in 1592, and D.D. in 1597.

In 1607 he was appointed Regius Professor of Divinity, in succession to Dr. John Overall.

In 1609 he was appointed Master of Peterhouse before accepting in 1615 the same position at Trinity. 

Some notes of his Lectiones de Predestinatione are preserved in manuscript in Cambridge University Library (Gg. i. 29, pt. ii.). He and Richard Thomson were among the first of the Cambridge divines who maintained the doctrine Arminianism in opposition to the Calvinists. He resigned in 1617 as a results of increasing anti-Arminian pressure. He then served in 1617 and 1618 as vice-chancellor of the university.

Richardson was a skilled hebraist and he served in the "First Cambridge Company", charged by James I of England with the translation of the books of the Old Testament from the Books of Chronicles to Song of Songs (comprising most of the Ketuvim) for the King James Version of the Bible.

At his death, Richardson left a bequest of £100 to Peterhouse.

Notes and references

Citations

Sources

Further reading
 McClure, Alexander. (1858) The Translators Revived: A Biographical Memoir of the Authors of the English Version of the Holy Bible. Mobile, Alabama: R. E. Publications (republished by the Marantha Bible Society, 1984 ASIN B0006YJPI8 )
 Nicolson, Adam. (2003) God's Secretaries: The Making of the King James Bible. New York: HarperCollins

External links

1564 births
1625 deaths
People from Linton, Cambridgeshire
Translators of the King James Version
Masters of Trinity College, Cambridge
Fellows of Peterhouse, Cambridge
Fellows of Emmanuel College, Cambridge
16th-century English translators
17th-century English people
Vice-Chancellors of the University of Cambridge
Regius Professors of Divinity (University of Cambridge)
Masters of Peterhouse, Cambridge
Arminian writers
16th-century Anglican theologians
17th-century Anglican theologians